Fulvio Valbusa (born February 15, 1969 in Verona) is an Italian cross-country skier who competed from 1992 to 2006. He won two medals in the 4 × 10 km relay at the Winter Olympics with a gold in 2006 and a silver in 1998. He also finished fifth in three other cross-country events at the 1998 Winter Olympics in Nagano (10 km + 15 km combined pursuit, 30 km, and 50 km).

Valbusa also won five medals at the FIS Nordic World Ski Championships, including one silver (15 km: 2005) and four bronzes (10 km + 15 km combined pursuit: 1999, 4 × 10 km relay: 1995, 1997, 1999). He also won three FIS races at 15 km in 1996, 1997, and 2004.

He is the older brother of cross-country skier Sabina Valbusa.

Cross-country skiing results
All results are sourced from the International Ski Federation (FIS).

Olympic Games
 2 medals – (1 gold, 1 silver)

World Championships
 4 medals – (1 silver, 3 bronze)

World Cup

Season standings

Individual podiums
2 victories 
13 podiums

Team podiums

 7 victories – (5 , 2 ) 
 22 podiums – (20 , 2 )

Note:  Until the 1999 World Championships, World Championship races were included in the World Cup scoring system.

References

External links
 
  
 
 

1969 births
Living people
Italian male cross-country skiers
Cross-country skiers at the 1992 Winter Olympics
Cross-country skiers at the 1994 Winter Olympics
Cross-country skiers at the 1998 Winter Olympics
Cross-country skiers at the 2002 Winter Olympics
Cross-country skiers at the 2006 Winter Olympics
Sportspeople from Verona
Olympic cross-country skiers of Italy
Olympic gold medalists for Italy
Olympic silver medalists for Italy
Olympic medalists in cross-country skiing
FIS Nordic World Ski Championships medalists in cross-country skiing
Medalists at the 2006 Winter Olympics
Medalists at the 1998 Winter Olympics